Kosmos 159 (meaning Cosmos 159), E-6LS No.111, was one of many satellites designed during the Soviet space program given the designation Kosmos. This satellite was specifically designed to be a high orbit satellite used to gain information on trajectory anomalies caused by the Moon's gravitational pull. This data would have been vital to the Soviet space program and could have been key in successful crewed missions to the Moon. This mission was also used to test radio communications in space.

Spacecraft
Kosmos 159 was a one-off high apogee Earth satellite developed to acquire data on new telecommunications systems for upcoming crewed missions to the Moon. The spacecraft was similar to Luna 11 but had a slightly lengthened (by ) instrument container so as to accommodate the modified DRK and new BR-9-7 telemetry systems.

Mission
The Kosmos 159 was launched 16 May 1967  at 21:43:57 GMT, which was a radio-equipped version of the E-6 used to test tracking and communications networks for the Soviet crewed lunar program. The objective of the mission was to acquire data on trajectory measurement techniques for future crewed lunar missions. Despite the incorrect orbit, controllers were able to accomplish the original mission, carried out over a period of nine days during which it was discovered that the energy potential of the UHF downlink from the spacecraft to the ground was 1–2 orders magnitude below the calculated value. Kosmos 159 reentered the Earth's atmosphere on 11 November 1967.

References

Soviet space probes